The houses at 2501–2531 Charles Street in the Perry South neighborhood of Pittsburgh, Pennsylvania, USA, were built in 1885.  The row originally included 25 nearly identical houses, 13 feet wide and 35 feet deep. All but 2 of the buildings survive.  They each have two rooms on the first floor, a parlor and a kitchen, and two bedrooms on the second floor.  A third bedroom comprises the third floor behind the mansard roof.  The houses rise gradually with the street, stepping up about 2 feet every fifth house.  Every fifth house also has a large decorative gable over the mansard roof.

These row houses were built by William A. Stone, who later became governor of Pennsylvania.  In 1887 Stone built a similar set of rowhouses on Brightridge Street. The Charles Street row was added to the National Register of Historic Places on March 15, 1984.

References

Houses on the National Register of Historic Places in Pennsylvania
Houses completed in 1885
Houses in Pittsburgh
National Register of Historic Places in Pittsburgh